Joshua Patton (born March 7, 1997) is an American basketball player for Hapoel Gilboa Galil in the Israeli Basketball Premier League. He plays the center position. He played college basketball at Sacramento State University. His 391 career fouls are tops in the Big Sky Conference, and his 199 career blocks are 4th.

Early life

His parents are Gary and Elene Patton, and Patton's hometown is Manteca, California.

Patton attended Sierra High School ('15). As a junior, Patton averaged 11.1 points, 9.1 rebounds, and 1.8 blocked shots per game, and shot .620 from the field. He was named Valley Oak League MVP, All-Area MVP, and first team all-VOL defense. As a senior, he averaged 15.3 points, 10.2 rebounds, and 3.3 blocked shots per game and shot.650 from the field. He was named the Stockton Record Player of the Year, league MVP, second team all-NorCal, and first team all-league.

College career

Patton majored in geography and played college basketball at Sacramento State University ('20), playing the center position. In 2016-17 he had 1.1 blocks per game (4th in the Big Sky Conference). In 2017-18 he had 58 blocks and 1.8 blocks per game (both leading the Big Sky), 118 fouls (2nd), a .611 2-point field goal percentage (3rd).

In 2018-19 he averaged 6.4 rebounds per game (9th in the Big Sky), 1.6 blocks per game (3rd), and had 51 blocks (3rd), 99 fouls (7th), a .609 2-point field goal percentage (3rd). On November 26, 2019, Patton was named the Big Sky Conference Ready Nutrition Player of the Week. In 2019-20 he had 1.9 blocks per game (2nd), and 57 blocks (again leading the Big Sky), and 108 fouls. In both 2018-19 and 2019–20, Patton was named All-Big Sky - 3rd Team. His 391 career fouls are tops in the Big Sky, and his 199 career blocks are 4th.

Professional career

In 2021-22 he played for Sporting Clube de Portugal in the Portuguese Primeira Liga. Patton averaged 11.5 points per game and 5.8 rebounds per game in FIBA Europe Cup.

In 2022-23 Patton is playing for Hapoel Gilboa Galil in the Israeli Basketball Premier League.

References

External links
Twitter page
Instagram page

1997 births
Living people
American men's basketball players
African-American basketball players
American expatriate basketball people in Portugal
American expatriate basketball people in Israel
Basketball players from California
Centers (basketball)
Hapoel Gilboa Galil Elyon players
Israeli Basketball Premier League players
People from Manteca, California
Sacramento State Hornets men's basketball players
21st-century African-American sportspeople